Senoia is a city located 35 minutes south of Atlanta in Coweta County, Georgia, United States. It is part of the Atlanta metropolitan area. Its population was 5,016 at the 2020 census.

History 
The first permanent settlement in the area was made in 1860 by Rev. Francis Warren Baggarly. In 1864, around the time residents of the nearby Willow Dell community began to arrive, the settlement was named Senoia. A number of the area's first structures appeared this year, such as a mercantile building known as the Rock House and a Methodist Episcopal church led by Baggarly. A high school would opened in 1865. Senoia was officially incorporated as a city on December 12, 1866.

Geography 
Senoia is located in southeastern Coweta County at  (33.301849, -84.553450). It is bordered to the north by Peachtree City in Fayette County.

Demographics

2020 census

As of the 2020 United States census, there were 5,016 people, 1,387 households, and 1,169 families residing in the city.

2010 census
At the 2010 U.S.census, there were 3,307 people, 1,175 households and 946 families residing in the city. The racial makeup of the city was 80.3% White, 14.5% African American, 0.3% Native American, 1.6% Asian, 1.1% from other races, and 2.1% from two or more races. Hispanic or Latino people of any race were 5.6% of the population.

2000 census
At the 2000 U.S. Census, there were 632 households, of which 38.9% had children under the age of 18 living with them, 61.9% were married couples living together, 11.9% had a female householder with no husband present, and 22.5% were non-families. 18.5% of all households were made up of individuals, and 4.3% had someone living alone who was 65 years of age or older. The average household size was 2.75 and the average family size  The median age was 31 years. For every 100 females, there were 98.9 males. For every 100 females age 18 and over, there were 92.9 males.

The median household income was $50,080 and the median family income was $56,382. Males had a median income of $36,000 versus $27,900 for females. The per capita income for the city was $18,819. About 5.6% of families and 7.4% of the population were below the poverty line, including 10.9% of those under age 18 and 8.6% of those age 65 or over.

Town name 
The derivation of the name "Senoia" is difficult to determine. There are four main theories:

 Senoya He-ne-ha was the wife of Captain William McIntosh. Their son, also named William McIntosh, was a general in the army and a chief in his band of Creek Indians. Senoya was a member of the prestigious Wind Clan of the Creek Indians. This is what established the idea of "Princess Senoia".
 From an edition of a one-time Senoia paper, the Enterprise-Gazette, comes this quotation concerning the naming of the town: "John Williams suggested the name Senoia for an Indian Chief of that name, a medicine man and philanthropist, noble, brave, and generous, who lived near the present location of Sargent."
 Another newspaper account in 1873 held that Colonel William C. Barnes came up with the name in honor of a clever Indian who formerly resided in the community.
 Others say that "Senoia" comes from Shenoywa, a Native American title for Chief William McIntosh.

In the media

Film and television 
Riverwood Studios is located in Senoia. Movies including Fried Green Tomatoes, Driving Miss Daisy and the 2011 remake of Footloose were partly filmed in the town.

Following its first season, principal production of The Walking Dead has been filmed in Riverwood Studios (doing business as Raleigh Studios Atlanta), a plot of land about  outside of Senoia. Downtown Senoia itself served as the set for a fictionalized version of the community of Woodbury during the third season of the show. Fans of the show have flocked to try to catch shooting, a development that has met with a negative reception from some town residents, while others have found the added tourists helpful for business growth.

In print
Senoia has been chosen twice to host the Southern Living Idea House, in 2010 and 2012. The Idea Houses are designer showcases of the finest trends in home design and furnishings.

 In 2010 a four-story  luxury brownstone that is part of the Historic Senoia Project was decorated by noted local designer and decorator Jamie McPherson.
 The 2012 Idea House is a renovated 1830s farmhouse located in Senoia's Gin Property neighborhood. The house was raised, moved a bit closer to the street, peeled back to its original materials, gutted, reconfigured, added on to, and redecorated. This was the first time that an Idea House was not a new building. Instead, the 2012 project was a restoration and enlargement of a historic home. The home is now a private residence.

Notable people 

 Cam Bedrosian, pitcher for Philadelphia Phillies; born in Senoia
 Steve Bedrosian, retired pitcher for the Atlanta Braves (father of Cam Bedrosian)
 Michael Bobinski, athletic director at Purdue University; lives in Senoia 
 Keith Brooking, linebacker for the Atlanta Falcons, Dallas Cowboys, and Denver Broncos; born in Senoia
 Bubba Pollard, ARCA Menards Series East, late model driver, construction worker
 Rutledge Wood, host of Top Gear US; lives in Senoia

References

External links 
 
 
 Senoia, Georgia, at City-Data.com
 Senoia Area Historical Society

Cities in Georgia (U.S. state)
Cities in Coweta County, Georgia
Populated places established in 1828
1828 establishments in Georgia (U.S. state)